Klaus Kertess  (July 16, 1940, New York City, New York – October 8, 2016, New York City, New York)  was an American art gallerist, art critic and curator (including of the 1995 Whitney Biennial).  He grew up in Westchester County north of New York City, the second of three children.  After graduating from Phillips Academy, he studied art history at Yale University and in 1966 founded the Bykert Gallery with his college roommate Jeff Byers. The gallery name was formed from a compound of both of theirs.  At Bykert he showed a roster of artists which included; Brice Marden, David Novros, Barry Le Va, Alan Saret, Chuck Close, Bill Bollinger, Dorothea Rockburne, and many others.

Later as an independent curator he oversaw the 1995 edition of the Whitney Biennial.  Then in 1998 he curated the exhibition DeKooning: Drawing/Seeing at the Drawing Center also in New York City.

Kertess suffered from Alzheimer's and died on October 8, 2016  after collapsing at his apartment.   He was 76. He is survived by his longtime partner, the painter Billy Sullivan.

References 

1940 births
2016 deaths
American art dealers
American art curators
People associated with the Whitney Museum of American Art